Vivo V9 is an  Android smartphone developed by  Vivo Communication Technology Co. It was initially released in April 2018.The phone has 64 GB of internal storage and 4 GB of  RAM. A  microSD card can be inserted for up to an additional 256 GB. The phone has an Octa-core 2.2 GHz Cortex-A53 CPU and an Adreno 506 GPU.

Specifications

Software 
As of June 2019, this smartphone comes with Android 8.1 (Oreo) with FunTouch OS developed by VIVO. The FunTouch OS is an enhanced version of Android designed to give an easier user experience for larger smartphones.

Hardware 
The Vivo V9 has 64 GB of internal storage, 4 GB of  RAM, and up to an additional 256 GB via  microSD. The rear facing camera has a resolution of 16 MP and also an 5MP secondary camera for depth effect, front facing camera comes with 24MP(f2.0). The phone has an octa-core 2.2 GHz Cortex-A53 CPU and an Adreno 506 GPU. 1

Variant

History 
Vivo V9 was first released in India in April 2019.

Reviews 
The phone has been described as overhyped but also a "great midrange smartphone".

References 

Android (operating system) devices
Vivo smartphones
Mobile phones introduced in 2018
Mobile phones with multiple rear cameras
Discontinued smartphones